The 1964 United States presidential election in Wyoming took place on November 3, 1964, as part of the 1964 United States presidential election. State voters chose three representatives, or electors, to the Electoral College, who voted for president and vice president.

Wyoming was won by incumbent President Lyndon B. Johnson (D–Texas), with 56.56 percent of the popular vote, against Senator Barry Goldwater (R–Arizona), with 43.44% of the popular vote. , this was the last time a Democratic presidential nominee has carried the state of Wyoming – in fact no Democrat has since reached forty percent of the state's vote. It is also the last occasion that Laramie County (home of Cheyenne, the state's largest city), Fremont County, Sheridan County, Park County, Uinta County, Lincoln County, Goshen County, Big Horn County, Platte County, or Hot Springs County have voted for a Democratic Presidential nominee.

Results

Results by county

See also
 United States presidential elections in Wyoming

References

Wyoming
1964
1964 Wyoming elections